Edulji Dinshaw Dispensary, officially the Eduljee Dinshaw Charitable Dispensary, is a building in the Saddar neighborhood of central Karachi, Pakistan.

History
Edulji Dinshaw Dispensary opened in 1882 as a charitable dispensary for Karachi residents. It was named after Karachi-based Parsi philanthropist Seth Edulji Dinshaw, who contributed 5,500 rupees toward the building's construction, accounting for half of the total cost. Dinshaw had risen from poverty to become Karachi's largest landowner at the time. The building was designed by James Strachan, and was Karachi's first Italianate building.

Gallery

References 

 

Saddar Town
Buildings and structures in Karachi
Tourist attractions in Karachi
Heritage sites in Karachi
1882 establishments in British India